Zdunowo may refer to the following places in Poland:
Zdunowo, Masovian Voivodeship
Zdunowo, Warmian-Masurian Voivodeship
Zdunowo, Szczecin